Luis Ferdinand Vega Jr. (born June 12, 1965), as known as "Little Louie" Vega, is an American DJ, record producer and remixer of Puerto Rican ancestry. He is one half of the Masters at Work musical production team.

Biography
He was born to a musician family, as his father, Luis F. Vega Sr., was a jazz saxophonist, and his uncle was singer Héctor Lavoe of the Fania All-Stars. Vega embarked on his music career as a disc jockey, spinning records at the age of 13.<ref>IMO Records.  "Little Louie" Vega Biography"], IMO Records' Retrieved on 08 March 2011.</ref>

By 1985, Louie began playing house and block parties in his local Bronx and his first nightclub residency was at the Devil's Nest, in the Bronx, and later he moved to heartthrob (the old Funhouse), Roseland, Studio 54 and the Palladium in Manhattan. During the 1990s, Vega was playing at one of the most influential nightclubs for house music, The Sound Factory Bar at the Underground Network Parties with promoters Don Welch and Barbara Tucker (also singer). During this time, production team Masters at Work began a remixing team which consisted of young producers "Little Louie" Vega and partner Kenny "Dope" Gonzalez.

Vega's uncle is salsa vocalist Héctor Lavoe, while Gonzalez's father, Hector Torres, also performs salsa. Vega is also the cousin of Eric Vega, a popular event creator and promoter in New York City. Louie Vega is presently married to vocalist Ana Martins, also known as Anané Vega.

Louie Vega was ranked #5 at the Top House Artists of 2020 by Traxsource.

Louie Vega was ranked #1 at the Top Artists of 2021 by Traxsource.

Discography
 See Masters at Work for the rest of his discographyAlbumsElements of Life (2004)Elements of Life Extensions (2005)
 Elements of Life Eclipse (2013)
 Louie Vega Starring...XXVIII (2016)
 NYC Disco (2018)
 Expansions In The NYC (2022)

Singles
Louie Vega/"Little" Louie Vega
1998 "Te Quiero"
1990 "House of Vega"
1991 "Ride on the Rhythm", with Marc Anthony
1996 "Hip Hop Jazz EP", with Jeffrey Collins
2000 "Elements of Life", with Blaze
2000 "Life Goes On", with Arnold Jarvis
2002 "Diamond Life", with Jay 'Sinister' Sealee and Julie McKnight
2002 "Brand New Day", with Blaze
2003 "Cerca De Mi", with Raul Midon and Albert Menendez
2003 "Africa/Brasil"
2004 "Thousand Fingered Man"
2004 "Mozalounge", with Anané, Raul Midon and Albert Menendez
2004 "Journey's Prelude", with Ursula Rucker
2004 "Love is on the Way", with Blaze
2004 "Steel Congo", with House of Rhumba
2005 "V Gets Jazzy", with Mr. V
2006 "Joshua's Arm", with Blaze
2007 "Here to Stay", with Soni
2016 "A New Day", with Caron Wheeler and Jazzie B

Sole Fusion
1992 "We Can Make It"
1994 "Bass Tone"
1995 "The Chosen Path", with Kenny Dope
1997 "We Can Make It '97"

Freestyle Orchestra
1989 "Don't Tell Me", with Todd Terry
1990 "Keep on Pumpin' it up", with Todd Terry
1998 "I Don't Understand This", with Kenny Dope
1998 "Odyssey/I'm Ready", with Kenny Dope

Hardrive/Hardrive 2000
1992 "Sindae", with Kenny Dope
1993 "Deep Inside EP"
1993 "Hardrive EP", with Kenny Dope
1999 "2000 EP"
1999 "Never Forget", with Lynae

Other aliases
1989 "There's a Bat in my House", as Caped Crusaders, with Todd Terry
1990 "Afrika", as History, with Q-Tee
1994 "Love & Happiness", as River Ocean, with India
1994 "The Tribal EP", as River Ocean, with India
1994 "Curious", as Sun Sun Sun, with Lem Springsteen
1995 "Reach", as Lil Mo Yin Yang, with Erick Morillo
1995 "Freaky", as Lou², with Lil Louis
1996 "The Missile", as The Chameleon
1996 "Shout-n-Out", as Lood, with Mood II Swing

Production for other artists
1987 Erasure - songs "Victim of Love" (Little louie Vega mix) and "Hideaway" (Little Louie Vega mix) on the remix album The Two Ring Circus1987 The Cover Girls - "Because of You", with Robert Clivilles
1988 Noel - "Like a Child", with Roman Ricardo
1990 Kimiesha Holmes - "Love me True"
1990 2 in a Room - "Take me Away", with Aldo Marin
1994 Barbara Tucker - "I Get Lifted"
1995 Barbara Tucker - "Stay Together"
1998 Donnell Rush - "Perfect Day for Company", with Lem Springsteen
2001 Gloria Estefan - "Y-Tu-Conga"
2003 Anané - "Nos Vida/Mon Amour"
2003 Ursula Rucker - "Release"
2004 Kenny Bobien - "Spread Love"
2005 Anané - "Amazing Love"
2005 Anané - "Let Me Love You", with Mr. V
2005 Anané - "Move, Bounce, Shake", with Mr. V
2007 Mr. V - "Put Your Drink Down"

See also
List of number-one dance hits (United States)
List of artists who reached number one on the US Dance chart

References

External links
  – official site
 Louie Vega / The Chameleon / Hardrive / River Ocean / Sole Fusion alias discographies at Discogs
 200 Sheep / Caped Crusaders / Freestyle Orchestra / Kenlou / Lil Mo' Yin Yang / Lood / Lou² / Masters At Work / Nuyorican Soul / Sun, Sun, Sun / Unreleased Project / Voices groups'' discographies at Discogs
 Louie Vega Train Wreck Mix at RBMA Radio On Demand
 Louie Vega Master Work

1965 births
Living people
Club DJs
Electronic dance music DJs
DJs from New York City
American electronic musicians
American house musicians
House musicians
Remixers
Grammy Award winners
Place of birth missing (living people)
Musicians from the Bronx
Musicians from New York City
American DJs
Record producers from New York (state)
Hispanic and Latino American musicians
American musicians of Puerto Rican descent